Aviogenex was a Serbian and Yugoslavian charter airline based at Belgrade Nikola Tesla Airport. It operated regular and ad hoc charter flights as well as wet-lease services.

History
Aviogenex had more than 40 years of experience in flying under charter, sub charter and wet lease agreements. Aviogenex was founded on 21 May 1968 as an air transport division of Generalexport, an enterprise for foreign and domestic trade, tourism and air transport. On 30 April 1969, Aviogenex operated its first flight from Belgrade to Düsseldorf Airport using a Tupolev Tu-134. Prior to the break-up of Yugoslavia, Aviogenex was the busiest charter airline in the country, handling over half a million passengers per year in the late 1980s. Aviogenex brought their first two Boeing 727-200 from Yugoslav Air Force in 1983.

The last Tu-134's in the fleet were retired in the early 90s. 

In 1990, the airline flew 633,932 passengers, with 10 aircraft (5 Boeing 727 and 5 Boeing 737) reaching 17,000 flight hours per year. Since 1991, Aviogenex has oriented to leasing of aircraft and crews, and achieved more than 40,000 flight hours. In this period Aviogenex operated in Europe, Africa, the Middle and Far East, and South America. In 2010, they restarted flights under their own name using a Boeing 737-200 Advanced.

In February 2015, it was announced that Aviogenex will cease operations to be liquidated as the government failed to attract investors for the airline.

Services

Aviogenex services included:
 International and domestic charter operations
 Aircraft lease with or without crew and technical personnel ("wet" or "dry" lease)
 Transfer of technology/know-how and logistic support
 AGX Engineering Dept maintains Boeing 727-200 and Boeing 737-200 Adv aircraft, to "B"-check level, and operates maintenance facilities (workshops) for its own needs and for the needs of others
 Aviogenex has a Training Center approved by the Ministry for Transportation of the Republic of Serbia for the education and training of its flight and ground staff, cockpit and cabin crew.
 Carriage of cargo and special cargoes
 Ad hoc transport arrangements for special purposes (artistic tours, football matches, VIP flights etc.)

Destinations

Aviogenex operated charter services to the following leisure destinations:

Africa

Hurghada – Hurghada International Airport
Sharm el-Sheikh – Sharm el-Sheikh International Airport

Djerba – Zarzis International Airport
Monastir – Monastir – Habib Bourguiba International Airport

Asia

Aqaba – King Hussein International Airport

Europe

Larnaca – Larnaca International Airport

Preveza/Lefkada
Corfu – Corfu International Airport
Heraklion – Heraklion International Airport
Kos – Kos Island International Airport
Rhodes – Rhodes International Airport
Santorini
Skiathos – Skiathos Island National Airport
Zakynthos – Zakynthos International Airport

Belgrade – Belgrade Nikola Tesla Airport Base

Barcelona – Barcelona–El Prat Airport
Palma de Mallorca – Palma de Mallorca Airport

Antalya – Antalya Airport
Dalaman – Dalaman Airport

Fleet
As of June 2015, the Aviogenex consisted of one single Boeing 737-200. The historic fleet of Aviogenex included 12 Tupolev Tu-134, 7 Boeing 737-200 and 5 Boeing 727.

Incidents and accidents
 On 23 May 1971, an Aviogenex Tupolev Tu-134A (tail number YU-AHZ) crashed on approach to Rijeka Airport located on the island of Krk, because of rough landing in bad weather conditions, killing 78 people and leaving five survivors. Among the victims was the Croatian poet Josip Pupačić with his wife and daughter.
On 2 April 1977, an Aviogenex Tupolev Tu-134A (registration YU-AJS) crashed on approach to Libreville Airport located in Gabon. It was a cargo flight, killing 6 crew and 2 passengers, without survivors.
On 22 February 1998, while operating for Chanchangi Airlines of Nigeria, an Aviogenex Boeing 737-200 (registration YU-ANU) was destroyed by a fire at Kaduna Airport, Nigeria. The aircraft was used for rejected takeoff training, with four rejected takeoffs in 12 minutes (in the conditions at the time at Kaduna, a single exercise of a rejected take off would have required a cooling period of at least ten minutes). A wheel caught fire due to overheating, and the aircraft burned completely. There were no fatalities.

References

External links

 

1968 establishments in Serbia
Airlines established in 1968
Airlines disestablished in 2015
Defunct airlines of Serbia
Airlines of Yugoslavia